Grêmio Recreativo e Esportivo Reunida may refer to: 
Grêmio Recreativo e Esportivo Reunidas (men's volleyball)
Grêmio Recreativo e Esportivo Reunidas (women's volleyball)